Anthony David McRae (born 7 April 1957 in Tumut, New South Wales) is an Australian politician. He was an ALP member of the Western Australian Legislative Assembly from 2001 to 2008, representing the electorate of Riverton. McRae unexpectedly won the traditionally Liberal seat of Riverton in the 2001 Gallop-led election and held the seat at the 2005 election.

Career

Early career 
McRae moved to Western Australia from Tumut in 1980 to work as an electrician in the Pilbara iron ore industry and became active in the Electrical Trades Union of Australia. He later moved to Perth and worked as labour market policy adviser to the Western Australian Government under Peter Dowding from 1985 to 1991, a greenhouse gas reduction consultant  from 1993 to 1995 and a Director at the National Native Title Tribunal from 1995 to 2000.

Politics 

While in parliament McRae served as:
 The Parliamentary Secretary to the Minister for Agriculture and Forestry from May 2005 to March 2006.
 Parliamentary Secretary to the Minister for Resources and Assistant to the Minister for State Development and Employment Protection from March 2006 to May 2006. 
 Minister for Disability Services, Citizenship and Multicultural Interests and Assistant to the Minister for Planning and Infrastructure from May 2006 to December 2006.
 Minister for the Environment, Disability Service and Climate Change from December 2006 to February 2007.

McRae was Western Australia's first Minister for Climate Change and co-authored the State's 2007 Climate Change Action Policy. 
He led Western Australia's argument in national forums for an equitable distribution of Commonwealth Disability funding - leading arguments for the establishment of the National Disability Scheme.

Other notable portfolio achievements include completing the expansion of the Dampier-Bunbury Gas pipeline reserve through the controversial Perth-Bunbury corridor; leading negotiations with landholders and conservationists on the State's $350m natural resource management plan; leading the opposition against the Australian Nationalist Movement fire bombings of Chinese restaurants in 2004; being one of the first Australian political delegation leaders to visit  Indonesia following Timor-Leste's independence.

McRae was one of a number of ministers who resigned in 2007 following CCC investigations into lobbyists and business-Government relations.
A 2008 parliamentary report recommended that no action be taken against Mr McRae.  Like others caught up in the then-unregulated world of political lobbyists, McRae had an adverse finding made about his dealings with lobbyists and former ALP members, Julian Grill and Brian Burke.  The WA CCC Parliamentary Commissioner noted in his report on the matter that McRae had "neither requested nor received" any benefit from his dealings with the lobbyists.

At the 2008 election, the Labor Party lost government, with a statewide swing against it of more than 6.5%, and McRae lost his seat of Riverton by 64 votes (a 2pp swing of 2.2%).

Post-politics 
Following the 2008 election McRae has worked as project leader on Timor-Leste's national labour market plan, was manager of an alternative school for disengaged youth, and a researcher and industry consultant on labour market implications of low-carbon technologies for Indigenous people.  From 2015 to 2018 he was CEO and Company Secretary of WA's largest Aboriginal-owned corporation and Trust (IBN Corporation) and Chairperson of the Pilbara Aboriginal Corporations and Enterprises Association. In January 2019, McRae commenced as CEO for the Western Desert Lands Aboriginal Corporation, the native title body for the Martu people.

References

1957 births
Living people
Members of the Western Australian Legislative Assembly
Australian Labor Party members of the Parliament of Western Australia
21st-century Australian politicians